Kabuliwala is a drama film of 2006 directed by Kazi Hayat. It was based on "Kabuliwala", an 1892 short story written by Rabindranath Tagore. Kazi Hayat conducted the screenplay and dialogues. Faridur Reza Sagar and Ibn Hasan Khan jointly produced this film under the banner of Impress Telefilm Limited. Manna played the title role in this film as Rahmat. Dighi played the role of mini. Her real life parent Subrata Barua & Doyel, played the role of her father and mother in this film. It was the first time they acted together in a film.

Kabuliwala was released on August 4, 2006. Dighi won the National Film Award as the best child artist for her role Mini.

Storyline 
Rahmat Sheikh is a fruit seller from Kabul, Afghanistan. He comes to Bengal province to hawk his merchandise. He becomes a friend of little girl Mini. Mini was the daughter of a writer. To Rahmat, Mini resembles to his daughter. He used to stay in a boarding house with some of his countrymen.

Suddenly, Rahmat receives a letter from Kabul saying his daughter is sick. He plans to leave for Kabul soon, so he goes to Jayanta for the money he owed for some products he bought on credit. Jayanta insults him and Rahmat stabs Jayanta as the situation goes out of control.

Rahmat is truthful in the court and confesses. The judge is impressed with his honesty and gives him 10 years of rigorous imprisonment instead of a death sentence.

Cast 

 Manna – Rahmat Sheikh, Kabuliwala
 Prarthona Fardin Dighi – Mini
 Subrata – Writer, Mini's Father
 Doyel – Mini's Mother
 Black Anwar – Vola
 Jacky Alamgir – Joyonto Sur. 
 Momena – Joyonto's Wife
 Nader Khan – Nader
 Habib Khan – Habib
 Kazi Hayat – Dialogue
 Fazle Haque
 Jahanara Bhuiya
 Dulari Chakroborty
 Kala Aziz – Pankaj
 Boby

Music 
Sagir Ahmed tuned the songs of Kabuliwala. M R Nilu directed the background music.

Awards 

National Film Award

 Winner Best Child Artist – Dighi

References

External links 

 

Films directed by Kazi Hayat
Bangladeshi drama films
Bengali-language Bangladeshi films
2006 drama films
2006 films
Articles with permanently dead external links
All articles with dead external links
2000s Bengali-language films
Impress Telefilm films